Gatoch Panom Yiech (born 30 November 1994) is an Ethiopian professional footballer who plays as a midfielder for Ethiopian Premier League club Saint George and the Ethiopia national team.

Club career

Ethiopian Coffee 
The Addis Ababa-based club Ethiopian Coffee was Panom's first professional club when he made his debut for them in 2012. After making many appearances and becoming a regular starter, his form with the club earned him his first call up to the Ethiopia national team in 2014. In June 2017, Panom become the first Ethiopian player to complete a transfer directly from an Ethiopian club to a Russian club when he made his move to FC Anzhi Makhachkala.

Anzhi Makhachkala
On 21 June 2017, Panom signed a three-year contract with the Russian club FC Anzhi Makhachkala. Anzhi registered him with the league as a Chad citizen.

Panom made his debut for the main squad of Anzhi Makhachkala on 20 September 2017 in a Russian Cup game against FC Luch-Energiya Vladivostok. On 14 December 2017, Panom's Anzhi contract was dissolved by mutual consent.

Mekelle City 
On 22 February 2018, Panom signed with Ethiopian Premier League debutantes Mekelle City FC on a contract that would keep him at the club until the end of the season. Due to a lingering muscle injury Panom had to sit out the first few games with the club until making his debut on 11 April 2018 against Jimma Aba Jifar FC.

El Gouna
In July 2018, El Gouna announced the signing of Panom.

Al-Anwar
In January 2020, Al-Anwar announced the signing of Panom.

International career
In January 2014, coach Sewnet Bishaw, invited him to be a part of the Ethiopia squad for the 2014 African Nations Championship. The team was eliminated in the group stages after losing to Congo, Libya and Ghana.

Career statistics

Club

International

Scores and results list Ethiopia's goal tally first, score column indicates score after each Panom goal.

References

1994 births
Sportspeople from Gambela Region
Living people
Ethiopian footballers
Association football midfielders
Ethiopia international footballers
Ethiopia A' international footballers
2014 African Nations Championship players
2021 Africa Cup of Nations players
Ethiopian Premier League players
Egyptian Premier League players
Saudi Second Division players
Ethiopian Coffee S.C. players
FC Anzhi Makhachkala players
Mekelle 70 Enderta F.C. players
El Gouna FC players
Haras El Hodoud SC players
Al-Anwar Club players
Wolaitta Dicha S.C. players
Saint George S.C. players
Ethiopian expatriate footballers
Ethiopian expatriate sportspeople in Russia
Expatriate footballers in Russia
Ethiopian expatriate sportspeople in Egypt
Expatriate footballers in Egypt
Ethiopian expatriate sportspeople in Saudi Arabia
Expatriate footballers in Saudi Arabia
2016 African Nations Championship players
2022 African Nations Championship players